Peristichia agria is a species of sea snail, a marine gastropod mollusk in the family Pyramidellidae, the pyrams and their allies.

Description
The shell grows to a length of 6 mm.

Distribution
This marine species occurs in the following locations:
 Caribbean Sea
 Colombia
 Gulf of Mexico
 Puerto Rico
 Atlantic Ocean : from North Carolina to Central Brazil.

References

External links
 To Biodiversity Heritage Library (5 publications)
 To Encyclopedia of Life
 To USNM Invertebrate Zoology Mollusca Collection
 To ITIS
 To World Register of Marine Species

Pyramidellidae
Gastropods described in 1889